Lake Bernard Frank (also Lake Frank), is a  reservoir on the North Branch of Rock Creek in Derwood, Maryland, U.S., just east of Rockville.  In the late 1960s it was renamed after Bernard Frank, a wilderness activist and a co-founder of  The Wilderness Society.  The lake's boundaries are, approximately, Route 28, East Gude Drive, Avery Road, and Muncaster Mill Road. Lake Frank was created in 1966 as Lake Norbeck to aid in flood and sediment control, as well as to provide recreation. It has an earthen dam, installed in 1967, on its southern side.  It was created as a sister lake to Lake Needwood. Lake Frank is owned by the Maryland-National Capital Park and Planning Commission (M–NCPPC).

The lake's secluded location within Rock Creek Regional Park is another of its assets. Visitors to the lake must bike or walk about 1/4 of a mile from all parking lots to get to the lakeshore.  The Lake Frank & Meadowside Trails surround the lake, making it a favorite hiking spot. Also, locals enjoy fishing from the shoreline, though a license is needed to do so.  However, swimming, boating, and  ice skating are prohibited.

The main trail around Lake Frank, the Lakeside Trail, is a 3 mile long loop.  Approximately 2/3 of the trail is unpaved and traverses the woods surrounding the lake.  The other part of the trail is wider and paved.  At the approximate half-way point of the trail, there is a creek that must be crossed.  Though there are a group of rocks which form a bridge-like path across, the creek may be impassable depending on the water level.

Water Quality 
In 1998, the Maryland Department of the Environment (MDE) identified Lake Frank as "impaired by nutrients" on its list of impaired surface waters. Eutrophic conditions in the lake were described at that time, evidenced by excessive algal growth and low dissolved oxygen levels.  In 2002, MDE prepared a report based on more recent monitoring data which indicated improved conditions.  The 2002 report proposed that the lake be removed from the impairment listing.

In 2017-2019, the Maryland-National Capital Park and Planning Commission warned of the lake water contamination with microcystin. Microcystin is a toxic substance produced by some species of blue-green algae (cyanobacteria) and is toxic to the liver.

References

External links 

 
 March 2019 map of Lake Frank and Meadowside Trails at Montgomery Parks
 GIS map of the Lake Frank Trail Connector at Montgomery Parks
 Rock Creek Regional Park brochure with trail maps, from Montgomery Parks
 Depth chart by iboating

Derwood, Maryland
Rockville, Maryland
Reservoirs in Maryland
Potomac River watershed
Lakes of Montgomery County, Maryland